Ann Bradford Stokes (1830–1903) was an American nurse. She is the first American woman to receive a military pension for her own services and was one of the first African American women to serve as a nurse in the Navy.

Biography
Stokes was born in 1830 into slavery as Ann Bradford in Rutherford County, Tennessee. In January 1863, she had escaped slavery and was taken aboard a ship. That same month, she volunteered to work as a nurse on the United States Navy hospital ship USS Red Rover where she assisted Sisters of the Holy Cross. Stokes was assigned the rank of "first class boy" and was paid for her work. Stokes worked until October 1864 when she resigned due to exhaustion.

She married Gilbert Stokes, who had also worked on the Red Rover and they moved to Illinois. After Gilbert died in 1866, Stokes remarried in 1867 to George Bowman. She applied for a military pension first based on her marriages in the 1880s, but was turned down. Later, after learning to read and write, she applied again for a pension based on her own military service and she was granted a pension of $12 a month in 1890. Not only was Stokes one of the first African American women to serve as a nurse in the US. Navy, but she was also the first American woman to receive a pension for her own service in the military.

Stokes lived in Belknap, Illinois until she died in 1903.

References 

1830 births
1903 deaths
African-American nurses
American women nurses
Female United States Navy personnel
People from Johnson County, Illinois
People from Rutherford County, Tennessee
People of Tennessee in the American Civil War
19th-century American slaves
United States Navy sailors
20th-century African-American people
20th-century African-American women
19th-century African-American women
African-American United States Navy personnel